Zarzalejo is a village in the Community of Madrid in Sierra Oeste. It had 1,404 inhabitants in 2007.

References 

Municipalities in the Community of Madrid